The Bible Speaks Today is a series of biblical commentaries published by the Inter-Varsity Press. It includes Old and New Testament commentaries as well as books on biblical themes. All the titles begin with "The Message of..." 

Tremper Longman notes that the series is "readable, accurate, and relevant."

Titles

Old Testament
David J. Atkinson, The Message of Genesis 1–11
Joyce G. Baldwin, The Message of Genesis 12–50
J. Alec Motyer, The Message of Exodus
Derek Tidball, The Message of Leviticus
Raymond Brown, The Message of Numbers
Raymond Brown, The Message of Deuteronomy
David G. Firth, The Message of Joshua
Michael Wilcock, The Message of Judges
David J. Atkinson, The Message of Ruth
Mary J. Evans, The Message of Samuel
John W. Olley, The Message of Kings
Michael Wilcock, The Message of Chronicles
Robert Fyall, The Message of Ezra & Haggai
Raymond Brown, The Message of Nehemiah
David G. Firth, The Message of Esther
David J. Atkinson, The Message of Job
Michael Wilcock, The Message of Psalms 1-72
Michael Wilcock, The Message of Psalms 73-150
David J. Atkinson, The Message of Proverbs
Derek Kidner, The Message of Ecclesiastes
Tom Gledhill, The Message of the Song of Songs
Barry G. Webb, The Message of Isaiah
Christopher J. H. Wright, The Message of Jeremiah
Christopher J. H. Wright, The Message of Lamentations
Christopher J. H. Wright, The Message of Ezekiel
Dale Ralph Davis, The Message of Daniel
Derek Kidner, The Message of Hosea
J. Alec Motyer, The Message of Amos
Rosemary Nixon, The Message of Jonah
David Prior, The Message of Joel, Micah & Habakkuk
Gordon Bridger, The Message of Obadiah, Nahum and Zephaniah
Barry G. Webb, The Message of Zechariah
Peter Adam, The Message of Malachi

New Testament
John Stott, The Message of the Sermon on the Mount
Michael Green, The Message of Matthew
Donald English, The Message of Mark
Michael Wilcock, The Message of Luke
Bruce Milne, The Message of John
John Stott, The Message of Acts
John Stott, The Message of Romans
David Prior, The Message of 1 Corinthians
Paul Barnett, The Message of 2 Corinthians
John Stott, The Message of Galatians
John Stott, The Message of Ephesians
J. Alec Motyer, The Message of Philippians
Dick Lucas, The Message of Colossians & Philemon
John Stott, The Message of 1 & 2 Thessalonians
John Stott, The Message of 1 Timothy & TitusJohn Stott, The Message of 2 TimothyRaymond Brown, The Message of HebrewsJ. Alec Motyer, The Message of JamesEdmund P. Clowney, The Message of 1 PeterDick Lucas and Christopher Green, The Message of 2 Peter & JudeDavid Jackman, The Message of John's LettersMichael Wilcock, The Message of Revelation''

References

Biblical commentaries